WYPC (1330 AM) is a radio station broadcasting a sports format. Licensed to Wellston, Ohio, United States.  The station serves the Wellston/Jackson area, is currently owned by Jackson County Broadcasting, Inc., the owner of the station since 1970, and features programming from Fox Sports Radio and Westwood One.

History
The station went on the air in 1953, as WKOV at 1570 kilohertz.  The station moved to 1330 kHz by 1958.  An FM station, WKOV-FM, was added in 1971.  WKOV-AM featured a full-service adult contemporary/MOR format until 1991, when the call letters changed to WYPC-AM, and the station switched to country music, with the AC format moving to WKOV-FM (which had programmed beautiful music).  WYPC-AM adopted an adult standards music format in the mid-1990s. WYPC-AM changed its format from Adult Standards to Sports Talk in August 2012.

References

External links

WYPC AM 1330 on Facebook

YPC